Beldandi is a Gaupalika in Kanchanpur District in the Sudurpashchim Province of far-western Nepal. 
Beldandi has a population of 21949.The land area is 36.7 km2.

References

Rural municipalities in Kanchanpur District
Rural municipalities of Nepal established in 2017